DWMG (1395 AM) is a radio station owned and operated by Vanguard Radio Network. The station's studio and transmitter are located at J. P. Rizal St., Solano, Nueva Vizcaya. DWMG is the pioneer AM station in the province.

References

Radio stations established in 1969
Radio stations in Nueva Vizcaya